Sabotage Gigante is the second studio album by American hip hop artist Rob Sonic. It was released on Definitive Jux in 2007. The album featured guest appearances from Rob Sonic's Definitive Jux labelmate Aesop Rock and from Busdriver. It is also fully produced by Rob Sonic.

Reception
Nate Patrin of Pitchfork Media gave the album a 6.9 out of 10, saying, "Sabotage Gigante has been said to be [Rob] Sonic's political album, at least in a more wide-ranging and universal way than Telicatessens the-personal-is-political themes, but there are so many generalities, abstractions, reappropriated slogans, moments of quadruplespeak, and pseudo-non-sequitur asides that much of the listener's time between headphones is spent trying to untangle it all."

On October 23, 2007, "Brand New Vandals" was chosen by KEXP-FM as their Song of the Day.

Popular culture 
In 2010, the song Brand New Vandals was featured in the video game Skate 3.

Track listing

References

External links

2007 albums
Definitive Jux albums
Rob Sonic albums